Nationality words link to articles with information on the nation's poetry or literature (for instance, Irish or France).

Events

991:
 The Battle of Maldon takes place, later celebrated in the Anglo-Saxon poem The Battle of Maldon

Births
Death years link to the corresponding "[year] in poetry" article. There are conflicting or unreliable sources for the birth years of many people born in this period; where sources conflict, the poet is listed again and the conflict is noted:

993:
 Samuel ibn Naghrela (died 1056), Jewish poet in Al-Andalus

Deaths
Birth years link to the corresponding "[year] in poetry" article:

990:
 Dunash ben Labrat (born 920), Jewish poet in Al-Andalus
 Kiyohara no Motosuke (born 908), one of the Thirty-six Poetry Immortals of Japan

991:
 Ōnakatomi no Yoshinobu (born 921), one of the Thirty-six Poetry Immortals of Japan
 Taira no Kanemori (born unknown), another of the Thirty-six Poetry Immortals
 Nakatsukasa (born 912), another of the Thirty-six Poetry Immortals

992:
 Fujiwara no Nakafumi (born 923), one of the Thirty-six Poetry Immortals of Japan

994:
 Fujiwara no Takamitsu (born 939), Heian period waka poet and Japanese nobleman

See also

 Poetry
 10th century in poetry
 10th century in literature
 List of years in poetry

Other events:
 Other events of the 12th century
 Other events of the 13th century

10th century:
 10th century in poetry
 10th century in literature

Notes

10th-century poetry
Poetry